Kwaśny is surname of:
 Dorota Kwaśna (born 1972), Polish cross country skier
 Joanna Nowicka (née Kwaśna; born 1966), Polish archer
  (born 1952), German politician (CDU)
 Zdzisław Kwaśny (born 1960), Polish hammer thrower

Polish-language surnames
Surnames from nicknames